This is a list of hospitals in Tunisia.  The hospitals include public regional, university, and district hospitals, as well as private hospitals.  In 2021, there were over 2,000 medical facilities, including 180 hospitals in Tunisia.    The number of hospitals has been increasing since the 1950s, as shown in the table below. 
  

As of 2017, there were 209 regional and district hospitals in Tunisia.

Hospitals

The notable hospitals are listed in the table below, along with the location and references for individual hospitals.

Historical hospitals

Before Tunisia was a French protectorate, it had only two health establishments: the Sadiki Hospital and the French civilian hospital.  In 1881, after the establishment of the protectorate, there were only four healthcare establishments: the Belvédère Military Hospital, the French civilian hospital, the Italian colonial hospital and the Jewish hospital (1895 to 1956).  As early as 1930, after the foundation of the public health and assistance directorate, the number of healthcare facilities increased and various medical services were provided.  From 1950, the administrative health structures evolved in order to better manage the health needs of the time, such as the fight against epidemicsmainly malaria, smallpox and tuberculosis.

See also
 French Wikipedia, Health in Tunisia
 Arabic Wikipedia, List of hospitals in Tunisia
 Health in Tunisia

References

Tunisia
Tunisia
Hospitals in Tunisia
Hospitals